Zsanett Bragmayer (born 29 March 1994) is a Hungarian triathlete. She competed in the women's event at the 2020 Summer Olympics held in Tokyo, Japan. She also competed in the mixed relay event.

Bragmayer also competes in Super League Triathlon events. She won the finale of the 2022 Arena Games Triathlon series in Singapore, which was enough for her to finish in second place in the inaugural Esports Triathlon World Championship series.

References

External links
 

1994 births
Living people
Hungarian female triathletes
Olympic triathletes of Hungary
Triathletes at the 2020 Summer Olympics
Sportspeople from Budapest
20th-century Hungarian women
21st-century Hungarian women